Glenn Heights Park & Ride is a small bus-only station located west of  I-35E in Glenn Heights, Texas (USA) and is under ownership of Dallas Area Rapid Transit. It is the southernmost transit center in the DART system.

Unlike many Transit Centers, Glenn Heights Park & Ride does not have a heating/cooling facility nor does it have a station attendant, however it does have four passenger shelters.

External links 
Dallas Area Rapid Transit - Glenn Heights Park & Ride

Dallas Area Rapid Transit
Bus stations in Texas